Henri Lepage (30 April 1908 – 26 October 1996) was a French fencer. He won a gold medal in the team épée event at the 1948 Summer Olympics.

References

External links
 

1908 births
1996 deaths
Sportspeople from Épinal
French male épée fencers
Olympic fencers of France
Fencers at the 1948 Summer Olympics
Olympic gold medalists for France
Olympic medalists in fencing
Medalists at the 1948 Summer Olympics
20th-century French people